Nixchen is a 1926 German silent film directed by Kurt Blachy and starring Hans Albers, Heinrich Peer and Olga Limburg. It is based on a novel of the same title by Hans von Kahlenberg.

The film's art direction was by Botho Hoefer and August Rinaldi.

Cast
 Hans Albers as Lutz von Lonna - Lawyer
 Heinrich Peer as Baumeister Georg Wessel  
 Olga Limburg as Marion, seine Frau  
 Xenia Desni as Lilly - deren Tochter, das Nixchen  
 Harry Liedtke as Esswein - Fabrikant  
 Karl Falkenberg as Birk - Herrenreiter  
 Adele Sandrock as Frau von Bremersdorf, Wessels Schwester  
 Ernst Rückert as Achim von Bremersdorf - ihr Sohn  
 Georg Burghardt as Rockweiler - Prokurist bei Wessel  
 Hermann Picha as Müller - Kanzlist bei Wessel  
 Karl Harbacher as Spitz - Schreiber bei Lonna

References

Bibliography
 Parish, James Robert. Film Actors Guide. Scarecrow Press, 1977.

External links

1926 films
Films of the Weimar Republic
Films directed by Kurt Blachy
German silent feature films
German black-and-white films